Ambolgad is a village near Jaitapur Nuclear Power Project in the Ratnagiri district in Maharashtra, India.

A Defence Officers Group named DARIYA (दरिया) has been formed by Col Dhanajirao Patil for bringing this village on World Map.

Villages in Ratnagiri district